Phase retrieval is the process of algorithmically finding solutions to the phase problem. Given a complex signal , of amplitude , and phase :

where x is an M-dimensional spatial coordinate and k is an M-dimensional spatial frequency coordinate. Phase retrieval consists of finding the phase that satisfies a set of constraints for a measured amplitude. Uniqueness theorems for both 1-D and 2-D cases of the phase retrieval problem, including the phaseless 1-D inverse scattering problem, were proven by Klibanov and his collaborators (see References).

Problem formulation 
Here we consider 1-D discrete Fourier transform (DFT) phase retrieval problem. The DFT of a complex signal  is given by 

,

,

where .

Since the DFT operator is bijective, this is equivalent to recovering the phase . It is common recovering a signal from its autocorrelation sequence instead of its Fourier magnitude. That is, denote by  the vector  after padding with  zeros.

,

Methods

Error reduction algorithm 

The error reduction is a generalization of the Gerchberg–Saxton algorithm. For the  th iteration the steps are as follows:

In the first step we calculate the Fourier transform of :

where the ' denotes an intermediate result that will be discarded later on.

Step (3): the estimate of the Fourier transform  is then inverse Fourier transformed:

Step (4):   then must be changed so that the new estimate of the object, satisfies the object constraints.  is therefore defined piecewise as:

where  is the domain in which  does not satisfy the object constraints. A new estimate  is obtained and the four step process is repeated.

This process is continued until both the Fourier constraint and object constraint are satisfied. Theoretically, the process will always lead to a convergence, but the large number of iterations needed to produce a satisfactory image (generally >2000) results in the error-reduction algorithm by itself being unsuitable for practical applications.

Hybrid input-output algorithm 

The hybrid input-output algorithm is a modification of the error-reduction algorithm - the first three stages are identical. The chief advantage of the hybrid input-output algorithm is that the function  contains feedback information concerning previous iterations, reducing the probability of stagnation. It has been shown that the hybrid input-output algorithm converges to a solution significantly faster than the error reduction algorithm. Its convergence rate can be further improved through step size optimization algorithms.

Here  is a feedback parameter which can take a value between 0 and 1. For most applications,  gives optimal results.{Scientific Reports volume 8, Article number: 6436 (2018)}

Shrinkwrap 
This leads to "image twinning" in which the phase retrieval algorithm stagnates producing an image with features of both the object and its conjugate. The shrinkwrap technique periodically updates the estimate of the support by low-pass filtering the current estimate of the object amplitude (by convolution with a Gaussian) and applying a threshold, leading to a reduction in the image ambiguity.

Semidefinite relaxation-based algorithm for short time Fourier transform 
The phase retrieval is an ill-posed problem. To uniquely identify the underlying signal, in addition to the methods that adds additional prior information like Gerchberg–Saxton algorithm, the other way is to add magnitude-only measurements like short time Fourier transform (STFT).

The method introduced below mainly based on the work of Jaganathan et al.

Short time Fourier transform 

The other interpretation (called sliding window interpretation) of STFT can be used with the help of discrete Fourier transform (DFT). Let  denotes the window element obtained from shifted and flipped window . Then we have

, where .

Problem definition 
      

Intuitively, the computational complexity growing with  makes the method impractical.

 ,    
 .    

The proof can be found in Jaganathan' s work, which reformulates STFT phase retrieval as the following least-squares problem:

.

The algorithm, although  without  theoretical recovery guarantees, empirically able to converge to the global minimum when there is substantial overlap between adjacent short-time sections.

Semidefinite relaxation-based algorithm 
To establish recovery guarantees, one way is to formulate the problems as a semidefinite program (SDP), by embedding the problem in a higher dimensional space using the transformation  and relax the rank-one constraint to obtain a convex program. The problem reformulated is stated below:

Once  is found, we can recover signal  by best rank-one approximation.

Applications 
Phase retrieval is a key component of coherent diffraction imaging (CDI). In CDI, the intensity of the diffraction pattern scattered from a target is measured. The phase of the diffraction pattern is then obtained using phase retrieval algorithms and an image of the target is constructed. In this way, phase retrieval allows for the conversion of a diffraction pattern into an image without an optical lens.

Using phase retrieval algorithms, it is possible to characterize complex optical systems and their aberrations. For example, phase retrieval was used to diagnose and repair the flawed optics of the Hubble Space Telescope.

Other applications of phase retrieval include X-ray crystallography and transmission electron microscopy.

See also
 Phase problem
 Crystallography
 X-ray crystallography
 Coherent diffraction imaging
 Transport-of-Intensity Equation
 Phase correlation

References 

Crystallography
Mathematical physics
Mathematical chemistry
Inverse problems